Piera is a municipality that covers a large portion of the southeastern corner of the comarca of Anoia in Catalonia, Spain, on the left bank of the Anoia river. The agricultural land, mostly non-irrigated, is used for the cultivation of cereals, grapes, olives and almonds. The town itself hosts a number of light industries: textiles, plastics and construction materials. Tourism during the summer months is also relatively important for the local economy.

The FGC railway line R6 from Martorell and Barcelona to Igualada runs through the town, while local roads lead to Capellades and Sant Sadurní d'Anoia.

Notable monuments include the castle of Fontanet. The castle which was restored in 1916 by Ramon de Viala d'Aiguavives, Baron of Almenar is documented in 955 a.c. and now used for private functions.

The sister of the Baron of Almenar, Isabel de Viala d'Aiguavives also financed and patroned the modernist church of Ca n'Aguilera which was donated to Barcelona's Bishop by Zaragoza de Viala family in 1921. The architect of Ca N'Aguilera modernist church is Francesc Berenguer i Mestres, who was Antoni Gaudi's disciple and personal friend.

Another Piera relevant monument is the church of Santa Maria, with both Gothic and Roman elements.

Subdivisions 
The municipality of Piera includes several outlying villages (barris): these are usually distinguished into the older, 
traditional settlements (barris antics) and the newer urbanisations which have been developed to cope with the 
expansion of the municipality (barris nous). Populations are given for 1999, from the Ajuntament de Piera and cited in 
Història de Piera: the town of Piera (nucli urbà) had a population of 5036 at that date, whereas the total population 
of the municipality was 8551.

Traditional barris 
El Bedorc (237), on the Anoia river
Ca n'Aguilera (161)
Can Cairot (28)
Can Creixell (2)
La Fortesa (57), on the Anoia river at the southern point of the municipality
Sant Jaume Sesoliveres (213)

Newer barris 
Bosc de l'Àliga (88)
Can Bonastre (490)
Can Bou (93)
Can Canals (602)
Can Claramunt (494)
Can Martí (222)
Can Mas (427)
Can Mata (166)
Castell de la Ventosa (51)
La Grua (20)
Vallbonica (26), on the road to Vallbona d'Anoia
La Venta i Can Musarro (138)

Demography

Twin towns
Piera is twinned with:

  Estepa, Spain

Independence declaration
On 30 October 2012, Piera proclaimed itself as a Free Catalan Territory.

References

Panareda Clopés, Josep Maria; Rios Calvet, Jaume; Rabella Vives, Josep Maria (1989). "Guia de Catalunya", Barcelona: Caixa de Catalunya.  .  .

External links 

  
 Government data pages 

Municipalities in Anoia